Hairy/enhancer-of-split related with YRPW motif protein 1 is a protein that in humans is encoded by the HEY1 gene.

Function 

This gene encodes a nuclear protein belonging to the hairy and enhancer of split-related (HESR) family of basic helix-loop-helix (bHLH)-type transcriptional repressors. Expression of this gene is induced by the Notch and c-Jun signal transduction pathways. Two similar and redundant genes in mouse are required for embryonic cardiovascular development, and are also implicated in neurogenesis and somitogenesis. Alternative splicing results in multiple transcript variants.

References

Further reading

External links 
 
 

Transcription factors